Busano is a comune (municipality) in the Metropolitan City of Turin in the Italian region Piedmont, located about  north of Turin.

Busano borders the following municipalities: Rivara, San Ponso, Favria, Barbania, Vauda Canavese, Oglianico, Front, and Valperga.

References

Cities and towns in Piedmont

be:Бузана